"Hollerbochen's Dilemma" is a science fiction short story by Ray Bradbury. Bradbury's first published work, it appeared in Forrest Ackerman's fanzine Imagination! in January 1938.

Synopsis

Hollerbochen is precognitive, and has the ability to stop time to get out of danger, but when he is faced with too many threats at once, he explodes.

Reception

"Hollerbochen's Dilemma" was poorly received, with Bradbury subsequently writing "no one enjoyed my story" and "I think it was terrible myself". Bradbury later wrote a sequel, "Hollerbochen Comes Back", in which a resurrected Hollerbochen rescues an imprisoned Bradbury and takes him to wreak wordplay-based vengeance on those who criticized the first story. Bradbury biographer Jonathan Eller has suggested that, together, the two Hollerbochen stories provide a "first glimpse of Bradbury's lifelong defense mechanism against developing an overweening ego."

In 2014, it was nominated for the 1939 Retro-Hugo Award for Best Short Story.

References

1938 short stories
Short stories by Ray Bradbury